Marian Barbara Holness  is a Professor in the Department of Earth Sciences at the University of Cambridge.

Education
Holness was educated at state schools in Southampton and the University of Cambridge where she studied the Natural Sciences Tripos and completed a PhD in 1990.

Career and research
Her research interests are in Earth Sciences, Geology, Mineralogy and Petrology.

She was elected a Fellow of the Royal Society in 2020.

References

Year of birth missing (living people)
Living people
Fellows of Trinity College, Cambridge
Alumni of the University of Cambridge
Female Fellows of the Royal Society